Jan Szczepański can refer to:

 Jan Szczepański (boxer) (1939–2017) Polish boxer
 Jan Szczepański (sociologist) (1913–2004)
 Jan Alfred Szczepański (1902–1991), film and theatre critic
 Jan Józef Szczepański (1919–2003), writer